The 1932 Colorado gubernatorial election was held on November 8, 1932. Democratic nominee Edwin C. Johnson defeated Republican nominee James D. Parriott with 57.23% of the vote.

Primary elections
Primary elections were held on September 13, 1932.

Democratic primary

Candidates
Edwin C. Johnson, incumbent Lieutenant Governor
E. V. Holland, Judge of the Colorado District Court

Results

Republican primary

Candidates
James D. Parriott, attorney
Warren F. Bleecker, state representative

Results

General election

Candidates
Major party candidates
Edwin C. Johnson, Democratic
James D. Parriott, Republican

Other candidates
Morton Alexander, Socialist
William Penn Collins, Farmer–Labor 
William R. Dietrich, Communist

Results

References

1932
Colorado
Gubernatorial